Colias christophi  is a butterfly in the family Pieridae. It is found in Kyrgyzstan and Tajikistan.

Description
Colias christophi has quite an exceptional aspect among Colias, the costal basal area having a peculiar reddish-brown colour, and the submarginal spots of the forewing being extraordinarily large and almost white, forming a continuous band which is traversed by the narrowly black veins. The hindwing is dark, feebly greenish with a white middle spot and a band of white submarginal spots. The underside is grey green, with a black middle spot on the forewing and a white one on the hindwing. The female differs only in the somewhat larger light submarginal spots on both wings.

Subspecies
C. c. christophi Kyrgyzstan
C. c. kali Korb, 1999 Tajikistan

References

External links
"Colias christophi Grum-Grshimailo, 1885". Russian-Insects.com.

christophi
Butterflies described in 1885
Butterflies of Asia
Taxa named by Grigory Grum-Grshimailo